The Mirra chair is a Herman Miller product designed in 2003 by Studio 7.5 in Berlin, Germany. According to the manufacturer, the chair is made from 42% recycled material, and at the end of its useful life it is 96% recyclable by weight. The chair has nine available adjustments intended to aid ergonomics: seat height, seat depth, tilt tension, tilt limiter, forward tilt, arm height, arm width, arm angle, and lumbar tension.

Mirra holds an Ergonomics Excellence Award (2004) by the Furniture Industry Research Association (FIRA), a silver Industrial Design Excellence Award (2004) by the Industrial Designers Society of America (IDSA), and a silver Cradle to Cradle certification by Business Week magazine, amongst other awards.

See also
 List of chairs

References

External links
 Herman Miller Seating Page

Products introduced in 2003
Chairs
Individual models of furniture